Mihaela Marinova  is a Bulgarian former women's snooker player who played on the circuit from 2002 until 2008, then later competed in 2013. She reached the quarter-finals of the World Women's Snooker Championship in 2005 and the final of the 2008 World Ladies Snooker Championship plate tournament. She was the top Bulgarian women's snooker player at the time.

Snooker career 
After turning professional in 2002, Michelle first entered the 2003 World Women's Snooker Championship but withdrew before playing her first match. In 2004 she was eliminated in Group B of the Connie Gough National, finishing third behind Lynette Horsburgh, then ranked number 1 in the world, and Caroline Walch, before losing to Marianne Williams in the plate tournament.

In the 2005 World Women's World Championship, she finished second in Group D and qualified for the quarter-finals ahead of veteran Jenny Poulter, before losing to eventual champion Reanne Evans 5-0, her best run in a main tournament event.

After a mini-break from the game, she returned for the 2008 World Ladies Snooker Championship, finishing fourth in Group D and thus being eliminated from the main tournament. In the plate tournament, she defeated Gaye Jones 2-1, Eva Palmius 2-0 and Pam Wood 2-0 to reach the final. In the final she lost to Malgorzata Sikorska in a deciding frame 1-2.

After leaving the tour, Michelle would play once more in 2013 at the Connie Gough Memorial, losing in her first match 3-1 to Martina Lumsden, then in the plate tournament losing to Poulter 2-0.

Personal life 
Mihaela was born in Sofia during the communist era. She attended Dudley Beauty College after leaving school. After quitting snooker, Mihaela founded social media and forum site Pawer and created a community for dog-lovers. She has a keen interest in photography of Sofia. Her father was the late Angolan President Dr. Antonio Agostinho Neto who died in Moscow 1979 when she was only 5years old . She is still not recognised by his family or the Angolan authorities.

References 

Bulgarian sportspeople
Female snooker players
Year of birth missing (living people)
Living people